Israa Abdallah Toufaily (born 27 May 2002) is a Lebanese former footballer who played as a forward. She played for Southern Stars and Primo at club level, and the Lebanon national team internationally.

Club career 
Coming from Southern Stars, Toufaily joined Primo on 10 May 2021. On 3 June, she scored a hat-trick against Sakafi Chhim in a 11–3 defeat.

International career
Toufaily made her senior international debut for Lebanon on 30 August 2021, as an 84th-minute substitute in a 5–1 win against Sudan in the 2021 Arab Women's Cup.

Personal life
Toufaily studied physical education at the Lebanese University.

See also
 List of Lebanon women's international footballers

References

External links
 

2002 births
Living people
Women's association football forwards
Lebanese women's footballers
Southern Stars Club players
Primo SA players
Lebanese Women's Football League players
Lebanon women's international footballers